The International Christian Medical and Dental Association (ICMDA) is an international organisation of Christians in medicine and dentistry. Its vision is to see a Christian witness through doctors and dentists in every community in every nation. Its mission is to start and strengthen national Christian medical and dental movements.

ICMDA is interdenominational and has member organisations in over 80 countries.

The ICMDA's International Office is in England.

Its logo is a reminder of the challenging call to provide compassionate care according to the example of Christ. It is inspired by the passage of scripture in John 13 where Jesus in humility washes the feet of his disciples and wipes them dry with the towel. The cross together with a basin & towel symbolise sacrificial love for and humble service to all humankind.

ICMDA holds a quadrennial World Congress, the next World Congress is due to be held in Arusha, Tanzania in 2023.

See also
Christian Medical and Dental Fellowship of Australia
Christian Medical Fellowship (UK)
Christian Medical and Dental Associations (US)
Christian Medical and Dental Society (Canada)
Christian Medical Association of India

References

External links

Christian charities